Lutz Pfannenstiel (born 12 May 1973) is a German former professional football goalkeeper, coach, scout, TV analyst and the current sporting director for St. Louis City SC. He holds the record for the only footballer to play professionally in each of the six recognized continental associations. Since 2010, he has been a soccer analyst on various television networks – including ZDF, BBC, CNN, ORF, SRF, DAZN, Eurosport and ESPN, where he currently covers the Bundesliga with Derek Rae. Pfannenstiel was appointed sporting director for MLS side St. Louis City SC ahead of their entry to the league in 2023.

Early life
Pfannenstiel was born in Zwiesel, Bavaria.

Club career
Pfannenstiel played for 25 different clubs all around the world during his career, including stints in Germany, Malaysia, England, New Zealand, Singapore, United States, Brazil, South Africa, Finland, Canada, Namibia, Norway, Armenia and Albania. Pfannenstiel showed immense promise as a youngster and represented Germany's under-17s. By the time he was 19, Bayern Munich had come knocking, but Pfannenstiel turned them down, knowing he would never be their No. 1 keeper, choosing instead to play for smaller clubs. After signing for Hermann Aichinger in Brazil, he became the first (and only) professional to have played in all six FIFA confederations. Throughout his career, Pfannenstiel played in over 500 professional games.

International career
Pfannenstiel is a former member of the Germany U-17 team.

Coaching career
In April 2008, Pfannenstiel became the Assistant Coach for Reinhold Fanz coaching the Cuba national football team and signed a contract in January 2009 to be the player-goalkeeper coach for Manglerud Star. In September 2009, Pfannenstiel left Norway and Europe to sign for Namibian club Ramblers who signed a contract as Player-Coach and Sport director besides working as goalkeeping coach of the Namibia national football team. From February 2011 to 2018, he was the Head Director of International Relations & Scouting for the Bundesliga club TSG 1899 Hoffenheim From 2018–2020, he worked with Fortuna Düsseldorf as their "managing director sports", and since 2020 he has worked at St Louis City SC in the United States as their sporting director.

Post-retirement
Pfannenstiel is the first, and so far only, football player to have played professionally in all six FIFA confederations. Since his retirement from active footballing he has worked for German side TSG 1899 Hoffenheim, while also pursuing television and writing.

He wrote his biography Unhaltbar – Meine Abenteuer als Welttorhüter; the book was released on 1 October 2009. and the UK bestseller The unstoppable keeper released in August 2014. During the 2010, 2014 and 2018 FIFA World Cups, Pfannenstiel worked as a pundit for the German television station ZDF, alongside fellow goalkeeper Oliver Kahn. He works as an expert for BBC World and CNN as well as Eurosport. He also works as a coaching instructor for FIFA and the German Football association (DFB) to educate coaches all over the world.

In 2011, Pfannenstiel also founded Global United FC, an international, non-profit, registered association in Germany dedicated to protecting the environment and raising awareness for climate change issues.

Legal and health issues
While playing football in Singapore, Pfannenstiel was accused of match-fixing and jailed for 101 days. He was later cleared of the charges.

Pfannenstiel stopped breathing three times after a collision with Clayton Donaldson while playing for Bradford Park Avenue against Harrogate Town in a Northern Premier League match on 26 December 2002. The injury was so serious that the referee, Jon Moss, abandoned the match. Bradford Park Avenue were leading 2–1 at the time of the incident.

See also
 Journeyman (sports)

References

External links
 Official website 
 Global United FC – Pfannenstiel's website to stop global warming
 FIFA notes 
 The German Journeyman: Football's Greatest Nomad

1973 births
Living people
People from Regen (district)
Sportspeople from Lower Bavaria
Footballers from Bavaria
German footballers
Association football goalkeepers

Penang F.C. players
Wimbledon F.C. players
Nottingham Forest F.C. players
Orlando Pirates F.C. players
Tampereen Pallo-Veikot players
FC Haka players
SV Wacker Burghausen players
Geylang International FC players

Bradford (Park Avenue) A.F.C. players
Huddersfield Town A.F.C. players

Bærum SK players
Calgary Mustangs (USL) players
Southern United FC players
KF Vllaznia Shkodër players

Vancouver Whitecaps (1986–2010) players
Clube Atlético Hermann Aichinger players
Flekkerøy IL players
Manglerud Star Toppfotball players
Ramblers F.C. players
Landesliga players

South African Premier Division players
Ykkönen players
Regionalliga players
Singapore Premier League players

Northern Premier League players
Norwegian First Division players
A-League (1995–2004) players
New Zealand Football Championship players
Kategoria Superiore players
Armenian First League players
Norwegian Second Division players
USL First Division players
Campeonato Catarinense players
Namibia Premier League players
Germany youth international footballers
German expatriate footballers
German expatriate sportspeople in Malaysia
German expatriate sportspeople in England
German expatriate sportspeople in South Africa
German expatriate sportspeople in Finland
German expatriate sportspeople in Singapore
German expatriate sportspeople in New Zealand
German expatriate sportspeople in Norway
German expatriate sportspeople in Canada
German expatriate sportspeople in Albania
German expatriate sportspeople in Armenia
German expatriate sportspeople in Brazil
German expatriate sportspeople in Namibia
Expatriate footballers in Malaysia
Expatriate footballers in England
Expatriate soccer players in South Africa
Expatriate footballers in Finland
Expatriate footballers in Singapore
Expatriate association footballers in New Zealand
Expatriate footballers in Norway
Expatriate soccer players in Canada
Expatriate footballers in Albania
Expatriate footballers in Brazil
Expatriate footballers in Namibia
Association football coaches
German football managers

Namibia Premier League managers
German expatriate football managers
Expatriate football managers in Armenia
Expatriate football managers in Namibia
German expatriate sportspeople in Cuba
German expatriate sportspeople in the United States
Association football goalkeeping coaches
West German footballers
Major League Soccer executives